The 103rd Regiment (Calgary Rifles) was an infantry regiment of the Canadian Non-Permanent Active Militia, authorized at Calgary, Alberta, Canada, by General Order on 1 April 1910.

History 

The 103rd Regiment was raised in Calgary as a militia unit. The first commanding officer was Lieutenant-Colonel W.C.G. Armstrong. The regiment was approved to train six companies of 50 men each, and later expanded to eight companies.

The unit initially paraded at the former Calgary General Hospital building (today known as the Rundle Ruins) before being ordered to vacate in September 1910. The unit then moved into the former drill hall of the Canadian Mounted Rifles on Centre Street and 12th Avenue SE. In 1911 a new armoury was found, in a former German-Canadian club a block south of their former home at the General Hospital. After Mewata Armouries was completed during the First World War, the regiment moved its offices to that location.

War Service

At the outbreak of World War I the regiment was not mobilized but served as a recruiting depot to raise battalions for the Canadian Expeditionary Force (CEF), the first being the 10th Battalion, CEF. The regiment also provided soldiers to man the internment camp at Castle Mountain. These soldiers were also employed full time as part of the Active Militia. A number of reinforcement battalions were commanded by former 103rd Regiment officers, including Lieutenant-Colonel William Charles Gordon Armstrong (56th Battalion (Calgary), CEF) and Lieutenant-Colonel George Morfitt (137th (Calgary) Battalion, CEF).

Reorganization
The 103rd Regiment was reorganized into two regiments in 1920 (the Calgary Regiment and The Alberta Regiment), each of which was reorganized into two regiments a few years later. None of the new units adopted the rifle regiment traditions of the 103rd.

Perpetuations
One of the resulting four regiments (the North Alberta Regiment) was disbanded in the 1936 reorganization of the Militia, but three present-day regiments claim descent from the 103rd: the South Alberta Light Horse, the King's Own Calgary Regiment (RCAC) and the Calgary Highlanders. These regiments perpetuate the 10th, 31st, 50th, 56th, 82nd, 89th and 137th Battalions of the Canadian Expeditionary Force all of whom were either raised in, or contained soldiers from, Calgary.

Descendants of the 103rd Regiment "Calgary Rifles"

References 

 Knight, Darrell. The Canadian Regimental Badge Book. (Calgary: private publication, 2008)

Rifle regiments of Canada
Military units and formations established in 1910
Military units and formations disestablished in 1920
Military units and formations of Alberta
Calgary Highlanders
King's Own Calgary Regiment
South Alberta Light Horse